Raman Sukumar is an Indian ecologist best known for his work on the ecology of the Asian elephant and wildlife-human conflict. He also works on climate change, and tropical forest ecology. He was born in India in 1955. In 1986, Sukumar helped to design the Nilgiri Biosphere Reserve, the first of its kind in India. In 1997, he set up the Asian Nature Conservation Foundation, a public charitable trust that incorporates the Asian Elephant Research and Conservation Centre, an organization that has carried out several field projects in India and other Asian countries on elephants and their habitats. In 2006, he was awarded the International Cosmos Prize, Japan, the first Indian to receive this award. He was also commended by the Prime Minister of India for contributions to the Intergovernmental Panel on Climate Change (IPCC) that shared the Nobel Peace Prize in 2007.

He received his Bachelor of Science degree from the University of Madras in 1977 and did a Masters in botany at the same university. He obtained a PhD from the Indian Institute of Science in 1985. He was a Fulbright Fellow at Princeton University in 1991 and was the Chair at the Centre for Ecological Sciences at the Indian Institute of Science for over eight years (2004–12). He continues to pursue conservation-based scientific research as a professor at this centre and is often called upon to represent Indian wildlife scientists in international, national and regional governmental committees.

Awards and fellowships
 1991: Presidential Award of the Chicago Zoological Society, USA
 1997: Order of the Golden Ark (The Netherlands)
 2000: Fellow of the Indian Academy of Sciences 
 2003: Whitley Gold Award for International Nature Conservation UK
 2004: T. N. Khoshoo Memorial Award for Conservation Science, Ashoka Trust for Research in Ecology and Environment, India
 2005: Fellow of the Indian National Science Academy 
 2006: International Cosmos Prize, Japan
 2006: Fellow, Geological Society of India 
 2013: Fellow, The World Academy of Sciences, Italy

Works
 The Asian Elephant: Ecology and Management (1989, Cambridge Univ. Press)
 Elephant Days and Nights: Ten years with the Indian Elephant (1994, Oxford Univ. Press)
 The Living Elephants: Evolutionary Ecology, Behavior and Conservation (2003, Oxford Univ. Press)
 The Story of Asia's Elephants (2011, Marg Publishers)

References

1955 births
Indian environmentalists
University of Madras alumni
Living people
Indian ecologists
20th-century Indian zoologists